David Lewis (11 May 1881 – 13 May 1928) was an American racecar driver. He was born in Syracuse, New York. He competed in the Indianapolis 500 four times, with a best finish of second in 1925. His appearance in the 1925 race with a Miller car was the first time that a front-wheel drive car had competed in the Indy 500.

Personal life
Lewis was the brother-in-law of Harry Miller. Lewis committed suicide in La Jolla Lodge, California, with a shotgun after a brush fire on his ranch got out of control.

Indianapolis 500 results

References

External links
Photo of 1925 2nd place Miller

1881 births
1928 deaths
Indianapolis 500 drivers
Sportspeople from Syracuse, New York
AAA Championship Car drivers
Racing drivers from New York (state)